Aliens in America is an American teen sitcom created by David Guarascio and Moses Port that aired on The CW for one season from October 1, 2007, to May 18, 2008. Guarascio and Port also served as executive producers of the show alongside Tim Doyle. Luke Greenfield directed the pilot. The show is about an American teenager in Wisconsin whose family takes in a Muslim foreign exchange student from Pakistan.

Plot
High schooler Justin Tolchuck (Dan Byrd) is a sensitive, lanky 16-year-old just trying to fit in at his high school in Medora, Wisconsin. He lives with his well-meaning mom Franny (Amy Pietz) who just wants him to be "cool" and fit in, entrepreneur dad Gary (Scott Patterson) who is very laid back, and his newly popular younger sister Claire (Lindsey Shaw), who tries to raise her popularity in school. When the school guidance counselor, Mr. Matthews (Christopher B. Duncan) convinces the family to take in an international student, they accept him with the expectation that he will be a good-looking European or Latin American student that will make Justin popular. Although initially dismayed when Raja Musharraf (Adhir Kalyan), a 16-year-old Muslim boy from Pakistan turns up instead, they soon warm up to him and although their cultures are different, Justin and Raja form an unlikely friendship that might allow them to get past the social nightmare of high school. Justin especially feels compelled to stick by Raja when he starts to notice the blatant racist and xenophobic attitudes of his classmates and community.

Cast

Main cast
 Dan Byrd as Justin Tolchuck
 Adhir Kalyan as Raja Musharaff
 Amy Pietz as Franny Tolchuck
 Scott Patterson as Gary Tolchuck
 Lindsey Shaw as Claire Tolchuck

Recurring cast
 Christopher B. Duncan as Mr. Matthews
 Adam Rose as Dooley 
 Chad Krowchuk as Brad
 Nolan Gerard Funk as Todd Palladino 
 Avan Jogia as Sam

Production and broadcast history

Produced by CBS Paramount Network Television, the series was officially green-lit and given a thirteen-episode order on May 15, 2007. It premiered on October 1, 2007, and aired on Monday nights at 8:30PM Eastern/7:30PM Central on The CW, following Everybody Hates Chris. The show was originally to be produced by NBC Universal Television (now Universal Television). It is filmed around the Vancouver, British Columbia, Canada area. The high school featured in the show is actually H. J. Cambie Secondary School in Richmond, British Columbia, Canada with the interiors of later first-season episodes shot inside a studio. Beginning on February 10, 2008, Aliens in America moved to Sunday nights (along with the rest of the Monday night comedies) and aired at 8:30PM Eastern/7:30PM Central. On May 9, 2008, TV Guide announced the cancellation of the series. After the show's cancellation, reruns once aired on Universal HD.

Patrick Breen was originally cast as Gary Tolchuck but the role was re-cast in July 2007.

Episodes

U.S. Nielsen ratings
Rating information is from Your Entertainment Now and The Futon Critic. The weekly rating information is from ABC Medianet.

Aliens in America averaged 1.57 million viewers in its sole season.

International distribution

See also
List of cultural references to the September 11 attacks

References

External links

2000s American high school television series
2000s American single-camera sitcoms
2000s American teen sitcoms
2007 American television series debuts
2008 American television series endings
The CW original programming
English-language television shows
Television series about families
Television series about teenagers
Television series by CBS Studios
Television series by Warner Bros. Television Studios
Television shows filmed in Vancouver
Television shows set in Wisconsin